The Jingju Theater Company of Beijing, formerly known as the Peking Opera Theater Company of Beijing, also known as the Beijing Peking Opera Company, is a theater company based in Beijing, and the largest jingju (Peking opera) performing group in China. Its main venue is the Chang'an Grand Theater, and productions are often aired nationally on CCTV-11. Unestablished performers also hone their skills in smaller theaters. 

In 2021, the company has 462 regular employees.

History
The current company was founded in 1979, but its direct predecessor, the Peking Opera Theater Troupe of Beijing, was founded in 1955. The troupe's staging of Hai Rui Dismissed from Office is often considered as a catalyst for the start of the Cultural Revolution.

In 2000, box-office gross was only ¥2500 per performance. Things improved in that decade, but box-office gross remained below ¥20000 before 2010. After Li Enjie took over, many market-oriented strategies have been implemented, such as contests, with the goal of cultivating more stars that appeal to the younger base. Shows staged in smaller theaters, such as those directed by the 1985-born Li Zhuoqun, have also been successful among younger people. Revenues have been improving slowly. In both 2017 and 2018, total gross revenue was reportedly close to ¥40 million, and by 2018 average gross had quadripled since 2009.

References

External site

1979 establishments in China
Peking opera troupes
Theatre companies in Beijing